Federal League Park or just Federal Park (also known as Greenlawn Park) is the name of a former baseball park in Indianapolis, Indiana, United States. The park was home to the Indianapolis Hoosiers of the Federal League in 1914. The park was constructed in 1913 and subsequently demolished in 1916 after the failure of the league.

The street location of the park was conventionally given in newspapers and city directories as "Kentucky Avenue and West Street". The location is more precisely described as Kentucky Avenue and a railroad track (southeast, center field); Oliver Street (south, right field); White River (some distance west, first base); and "Old Greenlawn Cemetery" (north, third base). Henry Street teed into Kentucky across from the left field area. West Street itself intersected Kentucky (and still does) about half a block to the northeast of the ballpark, where Kentucky ends and South Street begins.

The dimensions of the ballpark were:

 Left field - 
 Left center - 
 Center field - 
 Right center - 
 Right field - 
 Backstop - 

Coincidentally, the site of this short-lived ballpark is very close to current professional sports facilities in the city. The Kentucky-West-South intersection is just a block south of Victory Field and a block west of Lucas Oil Stadium.

See also
List of baseball parks in Indianapolis

References

External links
Sanborn map showing northwest portion of the ballpark, 1914
Sanborn map showing northeast portion of the ballpark, 1914
Sanborn map showing southwest portion of the ballpark, 1914

Defunct baseball venues in the United States
Federal League venues
Defunct sports venues in Indiana
Baseball venues in Indiana
Sports venues demolished in 1916
Sports venues in Indianapolis